Dan Golding is an Australian writer, composer, broadcaster, and academic. He holds a PhD from the University of Melbourne, and is currently a lecturer in media and communication at Swinburne University of Technology in Hawthorn, Australia.

Writing
Golding is the author of Star Wars After Lucas, and the co-author of Game Changers. Golding and his work has been featured on The Conversation, BoingBoing, Australian Broadcasting Corporation, and in Wired. His 2019 book, Star Wars after Lucas: A Critical Guide to the Future of the Galaxy, was reviewed on The Verge and in Leonard. As a writer, Golding won the Lizzie for Best Games Journalist at the 11th Annual IT Journalism Awards for work published with Crikey.

Music
Golding is the creator of the soundtracks for Untitled Goose Game, The Haunted Island, and Push Me Pull You. His soundtrack for The Haunted Island won the APRA AMCOS award for best music at the 2019 Australian Game Developer Awards. Untitled Goose Game was nominated for audio awards at the 2020 Independent Games Festival Awards, the Game Developers Choice Awards, and the British Academy Games Awards. In March 2020, Golding's soundtrack album for Untitled Goose Game was released by House House and Universal Music Australia.

Golding was the director of Australia's Freeplay Independent Games Festival from 2014 to 2017, and from 2006 to 2009 was a member of the Dili Allstars.

Broadcasting
Golding is the host of the weekly Screen Sounds program on ABC Classic radio, He is a co-host of the Art of the Score podcast. He has created video essays about film music, including A Theory of Film Music in response to a video by Every Frame a Painting. The dialogue between the two was described by Fandor as "an extraordinary case study in how popular video essayists and academically trained scholars can bring out the best from each other".

In 2015, Golding presented A Short History of Videogames, a four-part documentary series for ABC Radio National. With Linda Marigliano, Golding co-hosted the documentary series What Is Music for ABC Television and Triple J.

Discography

Albums

Awards and nominations

ARIA Music Awards

The ARIA Music Awards is an annual awards ceremony that recognises excellence, innovation, and achievement across all genres of Australian music.

|-
| 2020
| Untitled Goose Game (Original Soundtrack)
| Best Original Soundtrack, Cast or Show Album
|

References 

Living people
University of Melbourne alumni
21st-century composers
Musicians from Melbourne
Academic staff of Swinburne University of Technology
ABC radio (Australia) journalists and presenters
Year of birth missing (living people)